Baroness Sigrid von Laffert (18 January 1916 – 8 September 2002) was a German aristocrat. She accompanied Adolf Hitler to the German Opera House in Berlin, Germany in December 1935. She was rumored to be a romantic companion of Hitler during the time he neglected his companion Eva Braun, between early March and late May 1935. Von Laffert was also a relative of Viktoria von Dirksen, the widow of Willibald von Dirksen, secret legations counsel for Kaiser Wilhelm.

Von Laffert was a member of the Alliance of German Maidens (Bund Deutscher Mädel, or BDM) during the year 1932-1933. This was the girls' branch of the Hitler Youth. A blonde woman, she was considered among the most beautiful women around Hitler. She was invited by him to various festive events. Among these was a National Day of Celebration of the German People, held on May 1, 1934. The occasion was staged as a large propaganda public display at Tempelhof Field.

Von Laffert continued to appear at important Nazi government functions as late as March 1939. In 1939 she was invited to a state dinner in the Chancellor's home. It is plausible that Eva Braun was forbidden to appear on such occasions. She died in September 2002 at the age of 86.

References

1916 births
2002 deaths
German baronesses
Adolf Hitler
Hitler Youth members